Bradley Lavelle (31 March 1958 – 22 March 2007) was a British-based Canadian actor.

Born in Toronto, Ontario, Lavelle appeared in such films as Hellbound: Hellraiser II, Nightbreed and Memphis Belle.

He played a young American, Charlie Dameron, in the TV series Heartbeat, on 28 November 1993. He died in 2007.

Video Game
 1995 Flight of the Amazon Queen as Joe King / Commander Rocket Characters (voice)
 1996 Z as Brad / Zod (voice)
 1997 G-Police as (voice)
 1999 Urban Chaos as (voice)
 1999 Driver: You Are The Wheelman as John Tanner (voice)
 2001 Original War as (voice)
 2002 Big Mutha Truckers as (voice)
 2001 Gothic as various (voice)
 2002 Gothic 2 as The Nameless Hero (voice)
 2003 Battle Engine Aquila as (voice)
 2004 Malice: A Kat's Tale as (voice)
 2005 X3: Reunion as (voice)
 2005 Perfect Dark Zero as (voice)

Radio
 1991-1993 Mission Investigates
 1991 Design for Living
 1994 Waiting for Lefty
 2004 Children of the Corn

Filmography
 1983 Invitation to the Wedding as Burke
 1984 Supergirl as Lucy's Friend
 1985 Displaced Person (TV)
 1985 What Mad Pursuit? (TV) as Tim Murphy
 1986 The Last Days of Patton (TV)
 1987 Going Home
 1987 Superman IV: The Quest for Peace as Tall Marshall
 1988 Makaitoshi Shinjuki (as Brad Lavelle) as Kyoya (English version, voice) 
 1988 Hellbound: Hellraiser II as Officer Kucich
 1988 The Dressmaker as Party Guest
 1989 Worlds of Love (TV)
 1989 Tailspin: Behind the Korean Airliner Tragedy (TV) as Jamie
 1989 Vagen hem (TV) as Nick
 1990 Nightbreed as Cormack
 1990 Memphis Belle as Sergeant
 1991 Screen One (TV) as American Doctor
 1992 Waterland as Guest At Dinner Party
 1993 Jubei ninpucho as (voice: English version; as Brad Lavelle)
 1995 Judge Dredd as Chief Judge Hunter
 1998 Fallen Angels as (voice)
 1998 Razor Blade Smile (as Brad Lavelle) as The Chill Pilgrim
 2005 My Tumour & I as The Tumour
 2006 Alien Autopsy as New York Host

Theatre
 1994 Captain Kirk in Star Trek- The lost voyage of the Enterprise Churchill Theatre, Bromley, UK

Self
 1987 Omnibus (1 episode)
 1987 George Grosz: Enemy of the State (TV episode)

References

External links

1958 births
2007 deaths
Canadian male film actors
Canadian male television actors
Canadian male voice actors
English male film actors
English male television actors
English male voice actors
Male actors from Toronto